The following lists events in the year 2023 in Belize.

Incumbents 

 Monarch: Charles III
 Prime Minister: Johnny Briceño
 Governor-General: Dame Froyla Tzalam
 Chief Justice of Belize: Louise Blenman

Events 

Ongoing — COVID-19 pandemic in Belize

 1 January – 2023 New Year Honours.
 14 March - Commonwealth Day.
 1 August - Emancipation Day.
 2022–23 Premier League of Belize

See also 

 COVID-19 pandemic in North America
 2023 Atlantic hurricane season

References 

 
2020s in Belize
Years of the 21st century in Belize
Belize
Belize